James William "Ducky" Holmes (January 28, 1869 – August 6, 1932) was an outfielder in Major League Baseball. He played ten seasons in the National League and American League with the Louisville Colonels (1895–97), New York Giants (1897), St. Louis Browns (1898), Baltimore Orioles (1898–99), Detroit Tigers (1901–02), Washington Senators (1903), and Chicago White Sox (1903–05). His minor league career included stops in Lincoln (1906–07) as player manager, Sioux City as player manager (1908–09), and as manager in Toledo (1910), Mobile (1911), Nebraska City (1912), Sioux City again (1912–13), Butte (1914), Lincoln (1916–17), Sioux City (1918), Beatrice (1922), and Fort Smith (1922). He was the player manager of the Western League Sioux City Packers playing alongside one time White Sox teammate Danny Green. Born in Des Moines, Iowa, he batted left-handed and threw right-handed.

Holmes spent his first two seasons with the Colonels and played the next two seasons with four clubs. After a season's absence, he returned to play in the American League's inaugural season in 1901. In 932 career games, Holmes batted .282 with 236 stolen bases and 1,014 hits.

See also
List of Major League Baseball career stolen bases leaders

References

External links

1869 births
1932 deaths
Major League Baseball outfielders
Baseball players from Des Moines, Iowa
19th-century baseball players
Louisville Colonels players
New York Giants (NL) players
St. Louis Browns (NL) players
Baltimore Orioles (NL) players
Detroit Tigers players
Hanover Raiders players
Washington Senators (1901–1960) players
Chicago White Sox players
Major League Baseball left fielders
Major League Baseball right fielders
Lincoln Ducklings players
Lincoln Treeplanters players
Toledo Mud Hens managers
Frankfort Old Taylors players
Nebraska City Forresters players
Newark Colts players